This is a list of episodes for @midnight that aired in 2017.

2017

January

February

Episodes for the week of February 13–16 were aired live.

March

The week of March 27–30 is the second Tournament of Champions.

April

On April 28, 2017 @midnight began airing at 12:00 a.m. (EST) on Thursdays with The President Show airing at 11:30 p.m. (EST).

May

June

July

August

Notes
 * — Player normally eliminated with the low score, kept on for the final round.

References

External links
 
 

2017 American television seasons